William Hubble (20 June 1898 – 14 December 1978) was an English cricketer. He played one match for Essex in 1923.

References

External links

1898 births
1978 deaths
English cricketers
Essex cricketers
People from Leyton